BD1067 or N-[2-(3,4-dichlorophenyl)ethyl]-N-ethyl-1-pyrrolidineethanamine is a selective sigma receptor antagonist, with a reported binding affinity of Ki = 2 ± 0.5 nM for the sigma-1 receptor and greater than 19 times selectivity over the sigma-2 receptor.

Like other sigma receptor antagonists, pretreating Swiss Webster mice with BD1067 significantly attenuates the behavioral toxicity of cocaine.

See also

 BD1008
 BD1031
 LR132

References

Sigma antagonists